The 13149 / 50 Kanchan Kanya Express is an Express train belonging to Indian Railways – Eastern Railway zone that connects the cities of Kolkata and Alipurduar via Siliguri. It runs between  &  in Indian state of West Bengal. This train runs through the beautiful Dooars  region of West Bengal between Siliguri Junction and Alipurduar which includes Mahananda Wildlife Sanctuary, Sevoke Railway Bridge, River Teesta, River Jaldhaka, River Torsha, Dooars-Terai tea gardens, Gorumara National Park, Buxa Tiger Reserve, Jaldapara National Park, Chapramari Wildlife Sanctuary etc.

It operates as train number 13149 from Sealdah to Alipurduar Junction and as train number 13150 in the reverse direction, serving the state of West Bengal.

Coaches

The 13149 / 50 Sealdah–Alipurduar Kanchan Kanya Express presently has 1 AC 1 tier (HA1), 1 AC 2 tier, 3 AC 3 tier, 9 Sleeper class, 3 General Unreserved & 2 SLR (Seating cum Luggage Rake) coaches. It does not have a pantry car.

As is customary with most train services in India, coach composition may be amended at the discretion of Indian Railways depending on demand.

Service

The 13149 Sealdah–Alipurduar Kanchan Kanya Express covers the distance of 735 kilometres in 15 hours 40 mins (46.91 km/hr) & in 15 hours 30 mins as 13150 Alipurduar–Sealdah Kanchan Kanya Express (47.42 km/hr).

Schedule
13149/50 runs daily for both the sides.

Routeing

The 13149 / 50 Sealdah–Alipurduar Kanchan Kanya Express runs from 
 Sealdah (Kolkata) via 
 
 
 
 
 
 
 
 Rampurhat Junction
 Pakur railway station
 
 
 
 
 
 
 
 
 
  (Loco Reversal)
  
 Banarhat Railway Station
 Binnaguri Junction 
 Dalgaon Railway Station
 Hasimara Railway Station
 Hamiltonganj Railway Station to
 Alipurduar Junction.

Traction

Timings

13149 Sealdah–Alipurduar Kanchan Kanya Express leaves Sealdah on a daily basis at 20:35 hrs IST and reaches Alipurduar Junction at 12:35 hrs IST the next day.
13150 Alipurduar–Sealdah Kanchan Kanya Express leaves Alipurduar Junction on a daily basis at 15:15 hrs IST and reaches Sealdah at 08:20 hrs IST the next day.

Loco Reversal

Incidents
On 5 June 2021 a minor fire broke out in air conditioned coach of Sealdah-Alipurdiar up Kanchan Kanya Express near Siliguri Junction. It was later examined and extinguished by officials and the train continued its journey towards New Malbazar and Doars.

Other trains on the Kolkata–New Jalpaiguri sector
 22301/02 Howrah–New Jalpaiguri Vande Bharat Express
 12041/42 New Jalpaiguri–Howrah Shatabdi Express
 22309/40 Howrah–New Jalpaiguri AC Express
 12377/78 Padatik Express
 12344/45 Darjeeling Mail
 15959/60 Kamrup Express
 13175/76 Sealdah–Silchar Kanchanjunga Express
 12345/46 Saraighat Express
 15722/23 Paharia Express
 12518/19 Kolkata–Guwahati Garib Rath Express
 12526/27 Dibrugarh–Kolkata Superfast Express
 13141/42 Teesta Torsha Express
 13147/58 Uttar Banga Express
 12503/04 Bangalore Cantonment–Agartala Humsafar Express
 13181/82 Kolkata–Silghat Town Kaziranga Express
 22511/12 Lokmanya Tilak Terminus–Kamakhya Karmabhoomi Express
 12526/27 Dibrugarh–Kolkata Superfast Express
 15644/45 Puri–Kamakhya Weekly Express (via Howrah)
 12364/65 Kolkata–Haldibari Intercity Express
 12509/10 Guwahati–Bengaluru Cantt. Superfast Express
 12507/08 Thiruvananthapuram–Silchar Superfast Express
 12514/15 Guwahati–Secunderabad Express

References

External links

Transport in Alipurduar
Transport in Kolkata
Railway services introduced in 2000
Named passenger trains of India
Rail transport in West Bengal
Express trains in India
Alipurduar railway division